Royal Air Force Rackheath or more simply RAF Rackheath is a former Royal Air Force station located near the village of Rackheath, approximately  north-east of Norwich, England.

History

Mark II airfield lighting was installed, two T-2 hangars were erected for major aircraft maintenance, and dispersed temporary building accommodation provided for some 2400 men in the wooded countryside of the estate to the south-west of the airfield. A major overhead power line had to be put underground to clear the flying approaches.

USAAF use
The airfield was laid out on agricultural land between the two settlements of Rackheath Parva and Rackheath Magna.

The airfield was given USAAF designation Station 145.

467th Bombardment Group (Heavy)
The airfield was opened on 11 March 1944 and was used by the 467th Bombardment Group (Heavy), arriving from Wendover AAF Utah. The 467th was assigned to the 96th Combat Bombardment Wing, and the group tail code was a "Circle-P". Its operational squadrons were:
 788th Bombardment Squadron (X7)
 789th Bombardment Squadron (6A)
 790th Bombardment Squadron (Q2)
 791st Bombardment Squadron (4Z)

The group flew the Consolidated B-24 Liberator as part of the Eighth Air Force's strategic bombing campaign. 
The 467th began operations on 10 April 1944 with an attack by thirty aircraft on an airfield at Bourges in central France.

In combat, the unit served chiefly as a strategic bombardment organization, attacking the German navy harbor at Kiel, chemical plants at Bonn, textile factories at Stuttgart, power plants at Hamm, steel works at Osnabrück, the aircraft industry at Brunswick, and other objectives.

In addition to strategic operations, it was engaged occasionally in support and interdiction missions. It bombed shore installations and bridges near Cherbourg on D-Day, 6 June 1944. It struck enemy troop and supply concentrations near Montreuil on 25 July 1944 to assist the Allied drive across France.

In September, over two weeks the bombers flew gasoline from Rackheath to a forward base at Clastres in France for use by the US mechanized forces. Attacked German communications and fortifications during the Battle of the Bulge, December 1944-January 1945. To assist the Allied assault across the Rhine in March 1945 it attacked enemy transportation.

The group flew its last combat mission on 25 April 1945 and then returned to the US to Sioux Falls AAF South Dakota during June and July 1945. Subsequently the 467th was redesignated as the 467th Bombardment Group (Very Heavy) with Boeing B-29 Superfortresses in preparation for the planned invasion of Japan. The 467th was inactivated on 4 August 1946.

The airfield was returned to the Royal Air Force and a number of units were posted here:
 No. 94 Maintenance Unit RAF
 No. 231 Maintenance Unit RAF

Current use

With the end of the war, the airfield was closed permanently in late 1945 and the airfield site was returned to farming use. Very little of the runways, perimeter track, or hardstands now remain. Most of the concrete has been broken up for aggregate.

The technical site has become the Rackheath Industrial Estate with several of the wartime buildings being modified or extended, and used for light industry. The major access road on the estate was named Wendover Road to commemorate the airbase in the US where the 467th Bomb Group was formed. Other roads carry related names, including one after Albert Shower the base commander, "Witchcraft Way" after an individual aircraft of the group, and "Liberator Close".

The control tower still exists has been converted to use as an administrative building. The T-2 hangar nearby is virtually beyond recognition as compared to how it looked in 1943. Brickwork has been added to the front and the whole building has been repainted cream and green. Inside the building the roof girders appear to be original and identical to those seen on photographs taken in 1944. The other hangar, on the eastern side of the airfield, was dismantled many years ago.

A memorial to the 467th Bomb Group consisting of a plaque and a bench was dedicated in 1983, and is situated near the Rackheath village sign on the Salhouse Road, adjacent to the Holy Trinity Church.

October, 2022. Rackheath Pathfinders - Site 6 (467th) USAAF
Site 6 was a small part of the airbase comprising, amongst others, Commanding Officer's (and his deputy's) quarters. Officers' club, shower blocks, dining rooms, cinema, kitchen areas and several blast shelters. The site is bisected by Newman Road.

In March 2020 a volunteer group (The Pathfinders) was formed to help manage and “re-claim” the site.

A Facebook Group has been formed to enable people to follow the volunteers progress.

See also

List of former Royal Air Force stations

References

Citations

Bibliography

 Freeman, Roger A. (1991) The Mighty Eighth: The Colour Record. Cassell & Co. 

 Rackheath  www.controltowers.co.uk
 Rackheath at http://mighty8thaf.preller.us
 USAAS-USAAC-USAAF-USAF Aircraft Serial Numbers--1908 to present

External links

 Rackheath photo gallery
 467th Bomb Group website

Airfields of the VIII Bomber Command in the United Kingdom
Royal Air Force stations in Norfolk